The Bürgerliches Gesetzbuch, abbreviated BGB, is the civil code of Germany. In development since 1881, it became effective on 1 January 1900, and was considered a massive and groundbreaking project.

The BGB served as a template in several other civil law jurisdictions, including Japan, South Korea, Taiwan, Thailand, Brazil, Greece, Estonia, Latvia and Ukraine. It also had a major influence on the 1907 Swiss Civil Code, the 1942 Italian Civil Code, the 1966 Portuguese Civil Code, and the 1992 reformed Dutch Civil Code.

History

German Empire

The introduction in France of the Napoleonic code in 1804 created in Germany a similar desire to draft a civil code (despite the opposition of Friedrich Carl von Savigny’s Historical School of Law) which would systematize and unify the various heterogeneous laws that were in effect in the country. However, such an undertaking during the German Confederation would have been difficult because the appropriate legislative body did not exist.

In 1871, most of the various German states were united into the German Empire. In the beginning, civil law legislative power was held by the individual states, not the Empire (Reich) that was composed of those states. An amendment to the constitution passed in 1873 (named Lex Miquel-Lasker in reference to the amendment's sponsors, representatives Johannes von Miquel and Eduard Lasker) transferred this legislative authority to the Reich. Various committees were then formed to draft a bill that was to become a civil law codification for the entire country, replacing the civil law systems of the states.

A first draft code, in 1888, did not meet with favour. A second committee of 22 members, comprising not only jurists but also representatives of financial interests and of the various ideological currents of the time, compiled a second draft. After significant revisions, the BGB was passed by the Reichstag in 1896. It was put into effect on 1 January 1900, and has been the central codification of Germany's civil law ever since.

Nazi Germany
In Nazi Germany, there were plans to replace the BGB with a new codification that was planned to be entitled "Volksgesetzbuch" ("people's code"), which was meant to reflect Nazi ideology better than the BGB, but these plans did not become reality. However, some general principles of the BGB such as the doctrine of good faith (§ 242 BGB, Grundsatz von Treu und Glauben) were used to interpret the BGB in a Nazi-friendly way. Therefore, the political need to draft a completely new code to match the Nazis' expectations subsided, and instead the many flexible doctrines and principles of the BGB were re-interpreted to meet the (legal) spirit of that time. Especially through the good faith doctrine in § 242 BGB (see above) or the contra bonos mores doctrine in § 138 BGB (sittenwidriges Rechtsgeschäft), voiding transactions perceived as being contra bonos mores, i.e. against public policy or morals, the Nazis and their willing judges and lawyers were able to direct the law in a way to serve their nationalist ideology.

Germany from 1945
When Germany was divided into a democratic capitalist state in the West and a socialist state in the East after World War II, the BGB continued to regulate the civil law in both parts of Germany. Over time the BGB regulations were replaced in East Germany by new laws, beginning with a family code in 1966 and ending with a new civil code (Zivilgesetzbuch) in 1976 and a contract act in 1982. Since Germany's reunification in 1990, the BGB has again been the codification encompassing the civil law of Germany.

In West and reunited Germany, the BGB has been amended many times. The most significant changes were made in 2002, when the Law of Obligations, one of the BGB's five main parts, was extensively reformed. Despite its status as a civil code, legal precedent does play a limited role; the way the courts construe and interpret the regulations of the code has changed in many ways, and continues to evolve and develop, due particularly to the high degree of abstraction throughout. In recent years lawmakers have tried to bring some outside legislation "back into the BGB". For example, aspects of tenancy legislation, which had been transferred to separate laws such as the Miethöhengesetz ("Rental Rate Act") are once again covered by the BGB.

The BGB continues to be the centerpiece of the German legal system. Other legislation builds on principles defined in the BGB. The German Commercial Code, for example, contains only those rules relevant to merchant partnerships and limited partnerships, as the general rules for partnerships in the BGB also apply.

The BGB is typical of 19th century legislation and has been criticized from its very beginnings for its lack of social responsibility. Lawmakers and legal practice have improved the system over the years to adapt the BGB in this respect with more or less success. Recently, the influence of EU legislation has been quite strong and the BGB has seen many changes as a result.

Structure
The BGB follows a modified pandectist structure, derived from Roman law: like other Roman-influenced codes, it regulates the law of persons, property, family and inheritance, but unlike e.g. the French Code civil or the Austrian Civil Code, a chapter containing generally applicable regulations is placed first. Consequently, the BGB contains five main parts (or "books"):
the general part (allgemeiner Teil), Sections 1 through 240, comprising regulations that have effect on all the other four parts, such as personhood and civil status, emancipation, legal capacity, declarations of will, rescission, formation of contracts, limitation periods, and agency
law of obligations (Schuldrecht), Sections 241 through 853, describing contractual obligations and other civil obligations, including torts and unjust enrichment
property law (Sachenrecht), Sections 854 through 1296, describing possession, ownership, other property rights (e.g. servitudes, security interests, rentcharge, land charge), and how those rights can be transferred
family law (Familienrecht), Sections 1297 through 1921, describing marriage, marital property schemes, legal guardianship, and other legal relationships among family members
inheritance law (Erbrecht), Sections 1922 through 2385, which regulates what happens to a deceased's estate, as well as the law of wills and contracts concerning succession (pacta successoria).

Abstract system of alienation
One of the BGB's fundamental components is the doctrine of abstract alienation of property (German: Abstraktionsprinzip), and its corollary, the separation doctrine (Trennungsprinzip). Derived from the works of the pandectist scholar Friedrich Carl von Savigny, the Code draws a sharp distinction between obligationary agreements (BGB, Book 2), which create enforceable obligations, and "real" or alienation agreements (BGB, Book 3), which transfer property rights. In short, the two doctrines state: the owner having an obligation to transfer ownership does not make you the owner, but merely gives you the right to demand the transfer of ownership. The opposite system, the causal system, is in effect in France and other legal jurisdictions influenced by French law, under which an obligationary agreement is sufficient to transfer ownership; no subsequent conveyance is needed. The German system thus mirrors the English common law differentiation between in rem rights and in personam rights. The Chilean Civil Code, which came into force on 1 January 1857, also makes this differentiation between the titles and the actual acquisition of property, similarly to the Roman Law.

The separation doctrine states that obligationary agreements for alienation and conveyances that effect that alienation must be treated separately and follow their own rules. Also, under the abstract system, alienation does not depend on the validity of the underlying causa of the obligationary contract; in other words, a conveyance is sine causa (without legal consideration). From this differentiation it follows that a mere obligationary agreement, such as for the sale of property, does not transfer ownership if and until a separate legal instrument, the conveyance, has been drawn up and goes into effect; conversely, the alienation of property based on an invalid obligationary agreement may give rise to a restitutionary obligation for the transferee to restore the property (e.g. unjust enrichment), but until the property is re-conveyed, again by way of a conveyance, the transferred property is not affected.

Under the BGB, a sales contract alone, for example, would not lead to the buyer acquiring ownership, but merely impose an obligation on the seller to transfer ownership of the sold property. The seller is then contractually obligated to form another, and separate, agreement to transfer the property. Only once this second agreement is formed, the buyer acquires ownership of the purchased property. Consequently, these two procedures are regulated differently: the contracting parties' obligations are regulated by art. 433, whereas real contracts alienating movable property are provided for under art. 929. The payment of the purchase price (or valuable consideration) is treated likewise.

In day-to-day business, this differentiation is not needed, because both types of contract would be formed simultaneously by exchanging the property for payment of money. Although the abstract system can be seen as overly technical and contradicting the usual common-sense interpretation of commercial transactions, it is undisputed among the German legal community. The main advantage of the abstract system is its ability to provide a secure legal construction to nearly any financial transaction, however complicated this transaction may be.

A good example is retention of title. If someone buys something and pays the purchase price in installments, there are two conflicting interests at play: the buyer wants to have the purchased property immediately, whereas the seller wants to secure full payment of the purchase price. Under the abstract system, the BGB has a simple answer: the sales contract obligates the buyer to pay the full price and requires the seller to transfer property upon receipt of the last installment. As the sale obligations and the actual conveyance of ownership are embodied in two separate agreements, it is quite simple to secure both parties' interests. The seller maintains ownership of the property until the last payment, while the buyer merely possesses the property. If the buyer defaults, the seller may repossess the property just like any other owner.

Another advantage is that should the sales contract be found defective due to some vitiating factor (e.g. fraud, mistake, or undue influence), this would not affect the seller's ownership, thereby making it unnecessary to resell the property for the sake of transferring ownership back to the original seller. Instead, under the rules of unjust enrichment, the buyer is obligated to transfer the property back if possible or otherwise pay compensation.

Template for other jurisdictions 
 In 1896 and 1898, the Japanese government enacted a civil code (民法, Minpō) based on the first draft of the Bürgerliches Gesetzbuch; with post–World War II modifications, the code remains in effect.
 In 1923, the Government of Siam (Thailand) passed the Act establishing the Civil Code of B.E. 2466 (1923) which put into force the first two books of the Civil Code of Thailand. The enactment of the Civil Code (Pramuan kodmai phaeng) was a major event in Thai legal history. As one of the few independent Asian countries during the second half of the nineteenth century, the Thai government had desired to adopt the western legal system as a part of the country's modernization efforts. The project started in the late nineteenth century and, initially, the Thai Civil Code was based on the French Civil Code. But the advancement of legal science in Germany in the late nineteenth century - which culminated in the enactment of the Bürgerliches Gesetzbuch - convinced the government that the German code should be the model for Thailand's civil-law codification.

Trivia
: the BGB ends with sec. 2385.
Sec. 923 (1) BGB is a perfect hexameter:
Steht auf der Grenze ein Baum, so gebühren die Früchte und, wenn der Baum gefällt wird, auch der Baum den Nachbarn zu gleichen Teilen. ("Where there is a tree standing on the boundary, the fruits and, if the tree is felled, the tree itself belong to the neighbours in equal shares.")
Sec. 923 (3) BGB rhymes:
Diese Vorschriften gelten auch | für einen auf der Grenze stehenden Strauch ("These provisions also apply to a bush standing on the boundary.")
Although several other laws are meant to deal with specific legal questions deemed to be outside the scope of a general civil code, the highly specialised Bienenrecht (law of bees) is found within the property law chapter of the BGB (sections 961–964). This results from the fact that, in legal terms, bees become wild animals as soon as they leave their hive. As wild animals can't be owned by anyone, the said sections provide for the former owner to keep his claim over that swarm. But sections 961–964 are usually described as the least cited regulations in German law, with not a single decision of any higher court pertaining thereto since the BGB entered into force.

See also
French Civil Code
European Civil Code

Notes

External links 
 English translation of the BGB (German Civil Code)
 German BGB  by the German Ministry of Justice, Books 1, 2, & 3 
 Search the BGB 
 BGB-Informationspflichten-Verordnung 
 Civil law overview by the German Ministry of Justice
 Commentary on the BGB 

Civil codes
Law of Germany
1900 in law
1900 in Germany
Civil